This is a list of banks in Sri Lanka.

Central Bank
Central Bank of Sri Lanka

Licensed Commercial Banks
Amana Bank
Bank of Ceylon
Bank of China
Cargills Bank
Citibank
Commercial Bank of Ceylon
Deutsche Bank
DFCC Bank
Habib Bank
Hatton National Bank
Indian Bank
Indian Overseas Bank
MCB Bank
National Development Bank
Nations Trust Bank
Pan Asia Bank 
People's Bank
Public Bank Berhad
Sampath Bank
Seylan Bank
Standard Chartered Bank
State Bank of India
Hong Kong and Shanghai Banking Corporation (HSBC)
Union Bank of Colombo

Source: Central Bank, March 2021

Licensed Specialised Banks
Housing Development Finance Corporation Bank of Sri Lanka (HDFC) 
National Savings Bank
Regional Development Bank (Pradheshiya Sanwardhana Bank)
Sanasa Development Bank
Sri Lanka Savings Bank
State Mortgage and Investment Bank

Source: Central Bank, September 2020

Licensed Finance Companies
 Abans Finance
 Alliance Finance Company
 AMW Capital Leasing and Finance
 Asia Asset Finance
 Assetline Finance
 Associated Motor Finance Company
 Bimputh Finance
 CBC Finance (previously known as Serendib Finance)
 Central Finance Company
 Citizens Development Business Finance
 Commercial Credit and Finance
 Dialog Finance
 ETI Finance
 Fintrex Finance
 HNB Finance
 Kanrich Finance
 Lanka Credit and Business Finance
 LB Finance
 LOLC Finance
 Mahindra Ideal Finance
 Mercantile Investments and Finance
 Merchant Bank of Sri Lanka and Finance
 Multi Finance
 Nation Lanka Finance
 Orient Finance
 People's Leasing & Finance
 People's Merchant Finance
 Richard Pieris Finance
 Sarvodaya Development Finance
 Senkadagala Finance
 Singer Finance
 Siyapatha Finance
 SMB Finance
 Softlogic Finance
 U B Finance Company
 Vallibel Finance

Source: Central Bank, February 2023

Notes

References

Banking in Sri Lanka

Sri Lanka
Banks
Sri Lanka